Sialidase-4 is an enzyme that in humans is encoded by the NEU4 gene.

Function 

This gene belongs to a family of glycohydrolytic enzymes which remove sialic acid residues from glycoproteins and glycolipids.

Interactions 
Sialidase-4 has been shown to interact with phospholipid scramblase 1.

References

Further reading 

 
 
 
 
 

Human proteins